Timocratica megaleuca is a moth of the family Depressariidae. It is found in Colombia.

The wingspan is about 54 mm. The forewings and hindwings are white. The forewings beneath are suffused with ochreous yellowish except towards the dorsum and termen.

References

Moths described in 1912
Timocratica